Azerbaijan State University of Economics  is a public university located in Baku, Azerbaijan. UNEC was founded in 1930 and it is one of the biggest educational institutions of the South Caucasus. UNEC has 14 faculties, where 18.5 thousand students get education, and it offers master programs in 57 specialties, employing more than 1000 teachers, including 62 professors and 344 docents, among whom there are active members of the Azerbaijan National Academy of Sciences, New York Academy of Sciences, winners of state awards, honored teachers and scientists. UNEC is a full member of the European University Association, Federation of the Universities of the Islamic World, University Council of Organization of the Black Sea Economic Cooperation and Eurasian Association of Universities. Foreign students enrolled in undergraduate and graduate courses at UNEC are approximately 650 out of 18,400 student enrollment overall.

In 2007, a Library and Information Center and a student Career Center started functioning at UNEC and also a new 7 floor educational building that meets the highest international standards was opened. The same year UNEC received the “European quality” award and the   European Club of Rectors and European University Association. On its Main Building on Istiglaliyyat street, a 24/7 open library is operating since 2018.

The strategic direction of UNEC development was to bring the educational process up to the international standards by 2010, finishing the international accreditation process and ensuring full compliance with Bologna Process, as well as more active participation in the international market of educational services. Currently the university is chaired by rector professor Adalat Muradov and five vice rectors.

History 

Originally it was a part of Baku State University. It became a separate university in 1934. Over the years its name has changed a number of times and it was re-merged and re-separated from Baku State on several occasions.  On its creation in 1930, the school was named the Trade-Cooperative Institute.  In 1933, the government of Azerbaijan SSR changed the name to the "Azerbaijan Social-Economic University named after Karl Marx" (similar to the naming of the Azerbaijan Medical University named after Nariman Narimanov), and introduced curricula on accounting, law and finance.  In 1936 the name was tweaked to the "Azerbaijan Social-Economic Institute named after Karl Marx".  With the onset of World War II, UNEC was folded into Baku State University's Department of Economics.  By 1944 the school was separated again, this time as the Azerbaijan National Economic Institute.  It remained under this name until March 1959, when war caused it to be folded back into Baku State University.

In 1966 the school separated once again, and has remained independent since, initially as the Azerbaijan National Economic Institute named after Dadash Bunyadzade.  In 1987 the name was changed to the Finance-Economic Institute; and in 2000 the name was finally changed to its current form by an act of the Azerbaijani government.

Derbent branch 
The Derbent branch of the Azerbaijan State Economic University was founded in 1993 by Heydar Aliyev. However, the official opening of the branch of the Azerbaijan State Economic University in the city of Derbent of the Republic of Dagestan of the Russian Federation was held only in November 2016. The total area of the Derbent branch is more than 11 thousand km2. There are 32 classrooms in the university, with a total capacity of 1,000 students. In the first year 69 people were recruited to the university. At the moment, students can study in four areas:

 World economy
 Finance and credit
 Accounting, analysis and audit
 General Economy

Along with this, branch students also can enjoy all the privileges and international relations of the university – so they can also receive double diplomas and participate in international exchanges.

Zagatala branch 
Under the Azerbaijan State University of Economics, there is also a branch in one of the north-western cities of Azerbaijan – Zagatala. The basis of the Zagatala branch was laid on the basis of the branch of the Azerbaijan State Pedagogical University under the decree of the President of the Republic of Azerbaijan of April 29, 2016. The official opening of the branch took place on September 15, 2016. Training takes place in 4 main directions:

 Business management
 Finance
 Accounting
 Economy

The first set included 113 students from 37 different regions of Azerbaijan.

International cooperation 
The Azerbaijan State University of Economics has connections with foreign universities.

Thus, ASUE cooperates with the Siegen University of Germany in the direction of organizing summer and winter schools. In 2016, a winter school was held at the University of Siegen, in which participated teachers and students from both universities. A joint project entitled "Entrepreneurship education: as the main factor in creation of jobs and employment in Azerbaijan" started in 2016 and is planned to be completed in 2019.

UNEC was declared the winner of the TEMPUS IV program of the 6th convocation for a project called "Development and improvement of university management in the field of international relations". As a winner, ASUE was awarded a grant for implementation by the European Commission. In 2017, this project, whose goal was the formation of international relations based on the attraction of students and teachers in the international educational environment, was realized. Closing ceremony was attended by such personalities as the rector of ASUE Adalat Muradov, head of the office of the national program Erasmus+ Azerbaijan Parviz Bagirov, representative of the Ministry of Education of Azerbaijan Yashar Omarov, UK University of Warwick Fellow James Kennedy, Vice-Rector for International Relations and Programs ASUE Shahin Bayramov and as well as representatives of the Ministry of Education of Ukraine, Kyrgyzstan and Tajikistan.

In 2015, for the first time in Azerbaijan, ASUE joined the International Program of the London University – the London School of Economics (LSE). Within the framework of this program, ASUE students receive education both in accordance with the curriculum of ASUE and in the curriculum of the London School of Economics. Students are provided with all the necessary materials and benefits, and upon completion of the training the students of this program receive two diplomas.

In addition to the London School of Economics and Politics, students can receive a second diploma from the French University of Montpellier in 2016. This can be done in two ways: students can go to the University of Montpellier from the third year to continue their studies for a year there, or continue their studies at ASUE, but according to the curricula of Montpellier. In both cases, students receive accreditation and a second diploma from the University of Montpellier.

Awards and certificates 
2006 – Azerbaijan State University of Economics was awarded the "Golden Fortune" prize, which was held by the International Academy of Rating Technologies and Sociology. The university participated under the nomination "Rating of popularity". The award was given for the creation of a new model of economic education in the territory of the CIS. Before, ASUE received the "Silver Fortune" award in 2002.

2006 – ASUE was nominated for the National Award "Uğur". The prize was awarded for the fact that the university contributed to the development and advancement of science, as well as to the development of national cadres.

2007 – The university received the "University of the Year" award, which was held at the national level.

2007 – ASUE was awarded the “Intellect – 2007” Prize for the creation of the project of the Information and Library Center in ASUE.

2008 – At the conference held in Ankara, UNEC received an award for the contribution and development of the Turkic world and culture.

2009 – The International Academy of Professionals, which was established in Kyiv in 1996, awarded the "Golden Medal" to the Azerbaijan State Economic University for merits in the scientific sphere and training of personnel.

2009 – The "Child of Motherland" award and the "Dada Gorgud" medal were awarded to the university rector for the fact that the university made a contribution to the development of Azerbaijan, from both economic and social sides. The award was presented by the Supreme Council of the Dada Gorgud Foundation.

2010 – Within the framework of the international image program "Millennium Award" ASUE received three awards – a diploma, a cup and an order for the fact that the university used modern educational technologies and introduced innovations in the educational system.

2015 – The university was awarded the certificate "Best Performance" for the best presentation at the 9th Azerbaijan International Education and Career Exhibition. This is the only university that received the certificate "Best Performance" at the exhibition, which was attended by more than 130 institutions of higher education from 16 countries.

2015 – Business School ASUE was recognized as a full member of the Accreditation of the Business School of the European Foundation for Management Development (EFMD) for the first time in Azerbaijan.

2016 – UNEC retained its leadership among universities in Azerbaijan in accordance with the list identified by the rankings of the world's higher education institutions "The Ranking Web" and "Webometrics".

2016 – According to the latest results of 2016, introduced by UniRank, which determines the popularity of the world universities on the Internet, UNEC was the first among universities in Azerbaijan.

Honorary doctorates 

 H.E Mr. Heydar Aliyev, former president and national leader of Azerbaijan Republic
 H.E Mrs. Suzanne Mubarak, former First Lady of Arab Republic of Egypt
 Dr. Ismail Serageldin, director of Bibliotheca Alexandrina
 H.E Mr. Konstantinos Stephanopoulos, former President of Greece
 Joseph Stiglitz, Nobel prize winner
 Erik Stark M,  Nobel Prize Laureate in Economics, Professor at University of Harvard
 Finn Erlinq Kidland, Nobel Prize Laureate in Economics, Professor at University of Carnegie-Mellon University, Norway
 Christopher A. Pissarides, Nobel Prize Laureate in Economics, Head of Chair and program director at London School of Economics
 Robert Mandell, Columbia University Professor – US, Nobel Prize Laureate
 Roger Myerson, Nobel Prize Laureate in Economics, Professor of Arizona University (USA)
 Kenneth Arrow, Nobel Prize Laureate in Economics, Professor at Harvard University (USA), Founder of School of Economy

Rectors 
 Mehdi bay Ismayilov (1930–1934)
 Rashid Qayıbov (1934–1937)
 Macid Quliyev (1937)
 Habib Huseynov (1937–1939)
 Bilqeyis Hashimzade (1939–1941)
 Aliqulu Farajov (1945–1950)
 Xurshud Mammadov (1951–1954)
 Shamil Aliyev (1955–1959)
 Sarvar Aslanli (1966–1973)
 Zeynal Alakbarov (1973–1986)
 Ragib Guliyev (1986–1989)
 Fuad Alasgarov (1989–1992)
 Hasan Gasimov (1992–1994)
 İslam Garayev (1994–2000)
 Ali Abbasov (2000–2004)
 Shamsaddin Hajiyev (2004–2014)
 Adalat Muradov (2014-right now)

Famous graduates 

 Ismat Abbasov, Deputy Prime Minister of Azerbaijan Republic
 Avaz Alakbarov, former Minister of Finance of Azerbaijan Republic
 Fizuli Alakbarov, former Minister of Labor and Social Protection of Population of Azerbaijan Republic
 Azer Amiraslanov, The chief of Department for Agrarian Policy Issues of the Presidential Administration of Azerbaijan Republic
 Heydar Asadov, Minister of Agriculture of Azerbaijan Republic
 Rufat Aslanli, Chairman of State Committee for Securities of Azerbaijan Republic
 Nazim Ibrahimov, Chairman of State Committee on Work with Diaspora of Azerbaijan Republic
 Telman Ismailov, Ex Businessman
 Karam Hasanov, Chairman of State Property Issues Committee of Azerbaijan Republic
 Mikayil Jabbarov, Minister of Education of Azerbaijan Republic
 Eldar Mahmudov, former Minister of National Security of Azerbaijan Republic
 Fazil Mammadov, Minister of Taxes of Azerbaijan Republic
 Ali Masimov, former acting Prime Minister of Azerbaijan Republic
 Salim Muslumov, Minister of Labor and Social Protection of Population of Azerbaijan Republic
 Shahin Mustafayev, Minister of Economy and Industry of Azerbaijan Republic
 Elman Rustamov, Chairman of the Management Board of Central Bank of Azerbaijan
 Aris Hüseynov, Economist-Accountant of BCC Group of Companies

Interesting facts

Setting for Novel Ali and Nino 
Kurban Said's landmark novel, Ali and Nino, opens in a classroom in the Economics University building in Baku. Ali Khan, the protagonist, took his final graduation exams in that building, which is located on one of Baku's most prestigious streets – Independence (Istiglaliyyat), though at the time of the novel, it was called Nikolay Street, named after the Russian czar Nicholas II. Nino's school, now Public School No. 132, was located across the street.

Curiously, both Yusif Vazir (Chamanzaminli) (1887-1943), the Core Author of Ali and Nino, as well as Essad Bey / Lev Nussimbaum (1905-1942) both attended this school. Vazirov attended Baku Realni High School (having transferred in as a refugee from Shusha) beginning in 1906 and he graduated in 1909.

Lev Nussimbaum attended Men's Gymnasium No. 2, which at that time (1914-1920) was housed inside Baku Realni. Though Nussimbaum was often absent due to sickness and political unrest, he was enrolled from Junior Preparatory to the beginning of Fourth Grade when he fled the Bolshevik takeover of the Baku government (1920). This school offered classes through Eighth Grade. Documents indicate that Nussimbaum failed his Azerbaijani class in 1919, the only time records exist showing that he had enrolled in Azerbaijani.

For the first time in the country, the 7/24 library at UNEC allows students to easily prepare for classes and exams.

References

External links 
Azerbaijan State Economic University

 
Business schools in Azerbaijan
Educational institutions established in 1930
1930 establishments in the Transcaucasian Socialist Federative Soviet Republic
Derbent
Universities in Baku
1930 establishments in Azerbaijan